Axel Maraval (born 20 October 1993) is a French professional footballer who plays as a goalkeeper for  club Nîmes.

Club career
A youth product of Monaco, Maraval left the club in July 2014 to gain more playing time, signing for AC Arles-Avignon. He made his full professional debut a few months later, in a 1–0 Ligue 2 defeat against Sochaux.

On 1 February 2016, he signed for Slovenian club NK Domžale.

He returned to France with Sedan at the end of 2016, joining USL Dunkerque at the end of the 2017–18 season.

In June 2022, Maraval signed a contract with Nîmes until June 2025.

References

External links
 
 
 Axel Maraval foot-national.com profile
 

1993 births
Living people
Association football goalkeepers
French footballers
Ligue 2 players
Championnat National players
AC Arlésien players
French expatriate footballers
French expatriate sportspeople in Slovenia
Expatriate footballers in Slovenia
Slovenian PrvaLiga players
NK Domžale players
CS Sedan Ardennes players
USL Dunkerque players
Nîmes Olympique players
Footballers from Marseille